The 2019 African Women's Youth Handball Championship was the 14th edition of the championship held in Niamey, Niger from 16 to 24 September 2019. It also acted as qualification tournament for the 2020 Women's Youth World Handball Championship to be held in China.

Participating teams

Note: Bold indicates champion for that year. Italic indicates host for that year.

Results
All times are local (UTC+1).

References

2019 in African handball
African Women's Youth Handball Championship
International handball competitions hosted by Niger
African Youth
Youth
African Women's Youth Handball Championship